Woodbridge may refer to:

Places

Australia
Woodbridge, Western Australia formerly called West Midland
Woodbridge, Tasmania

Canada
Woodbridge, Ontario

England
Woodbridge, Suffolk, the location of
Woodbridge (UK Parliament constituency), 1885–1950
Woodbridge School
RAF Woodbridge
Woodbridge High School, Redbridge
Woodbridge, Devon
Woodbridge, Dorset
Woodbridge, Gloucestershire, a location
Woodbridge, Northumberland, a location

United States
Woodbridge, California
Woodbridge, Irvine, California
Woodbridge, Connecticut
Woodbridge Township, New Jersey
Woodbridge (CDP), New Jersey
Woodbridge, Virginia
Woodbridge, Dallas, Texas, a neighborhood
Woodbridge, Detroit

Other uses
Woodbridge (plantation), formerly in Prince William County, Virginia, US
Woodbridge (surname)
The Woodbridge Company
Woodbridge's Regiment of Militia, a Massachusetts regiment in the American Revolutionary War
Woodbridge wine, made by Robert Mondavi (now part of Constellation Brands)
Institute of Mental Health (Singapore), also known by its former name as Woodbridge Hospital
Justice Woodbridge (disambiguation)

See also
Woodbridge Hall (disambiguation)
Woodbridge High School (disambiguation)
Woodbridge station (disambiguation), train stations of the name
Woodbridge Township (disambiguation)
Woodenbridge, a village in the Republic of Ireland
 Woodridge (disambiguation)